Fazenda is a type of plantation in colonial Brazil.

Fazenda may also refer to:

 Fazenda (Lajes das Flores), a parish in the Azores
 Fazenda, Cape Verde, a settlement in Cabo Verde
 Fazenda, Praia, a subdivision of Praia, Cabo Verde
 "(Ministry of) Fazenda", former name of:
 Ministry of the Economy (Brazil)
 Ministry of Finance (Portugal)
 Louise Fazenda, American film actress
 Ricardo Fazenda, Portuguese footballer

See also 
 
 A Fazenda, a Brazilian reality TV show